Fibrodysplasia may refer to:

 Fibrodysplasia ossificans progressiva, a rare disease in which fibrous tissue becomes ossified  
 Fibromuscular dysplasia, a disease characterized by the fibrous thickening of the renal artery
 Fibrous dysplasia, a disease that causes growths or lesions in one or more bones of the human body